Daniel Hans Erwin Zimmermann (born 30 October 1966 in Nürnberg, West Germany) is a retired heavy metal drummer. Dan is best known as having been the drummer of German power metal bands Gamma Ray and Freedom Call from 1997 to 2012. He was a founding member of Freedom Call, from which he departed in 2010. Two years later he also left Gamma Ray, announcing a rest from the music business in 2012.

Discography

With Gamma Ray
Valley of the Kings (1997)
Somewhere Out In Space (1997)
The Karaoke Album (1997) - Karaoke Compilation album
Power Plant (1999)
Blast from the Past (2000) - "Best of" Compilation album
No World Order (2001)
Skeletons in the Closet (2003)
Majestic (2005)
Land of the Free II (2007)
Hell Yeah! The Awesome Foursome (2008)
To The Metal (2010)
Skeletons & Majesties (EP) (2011)
Skeletons & Majesties Live (2012)
The Best (Of) (2015)

With Freedom Call
Stairway To Fairyland (1999)
Taragon EP (1999)
Crystal Empire (2001)
Eternity (2002)
Live Invasion (2004)
The Circle of Life (2005)
Dimensions (2007)
Legend of the Shadowking (2010)
Ages of Light 1998-2013 (2013)

With Lanzer
Under A Different Sun (1995)

With Hirsch und Palatzky
Saitenfeue  (1997)

With Lenny Wolf
Lenny Wolf  (1999)

With Iron Savior
Coming Home (single)  (1998)
Unification  (1999)

External links
 Profile on official Gamma Ray website

Living people
German heavy metal drummers
Male drummers
German male musicians
1966 births
Musicians from Nuremberg
Iron Savior members
Gamma Ray (band) members
Freedom Call members